Lucie Dreyfus-Hadamard (23 August 1869 – 14 December 1945) was the wife of Alfred Dreyfus, and his main and unwavering support during the Affair that shook the couple from 1894 to 1906. She never ceased to defend the honor of her husband.

Life 

The Hadamard family hailed from Koblenz, and spread to Metz and then settled, in the early nineteenth century, in Paris. David Hadamard, Lucie's father, was a diamond merchant in Paris. The couple organized many receptions. In one of them, Lucie met Alfred Dreyfus, a classmate of her cousin Paul Hadamard. The couple became engaged during the winter of 1889–1890. They were married in Paris on 18 April 1891, celebrated at the Grand Synagogue of Paris, on the 21st by the Chief Rabbi of France, Zadoc Kahn who stood with the Dreyfusards afterwards. The couple moved near the Champs-Élysées, at Rue François-Ier. They went on a honeymoon trip to Italy and then to Switzerland, before returning by making a stop in Mulhouse. The couple had two children, Pierre-Léon (1891-1946) and Jeanne (1893-1981). Lucie was interested in literature, played the piano and kept reading her favorite historian: Numa Denis Fustel de Coulanges.

Dreyfus affair 
In 1894, her husband was arrested, the Dreyfus Affair breaks out. She addressed a petition to the chamber and a petition to the Pope on the 16 September 1896. Called as a witness by Emile Zola, President Delegorgue refused that she be heard. She saw her request for revision of 3 September 1898 be accepted.

Lucie visited her husband daily in Parisian prisons and then on the Île de Ré. She has an important correspondence with her husband, even when he is exiled to Devil's Island. 

She published some letters to raise public awareness of the innocence of her husband. She was in Rennes and waited for his appearance during his second trial on 1 July 1899. He was sentenced again to ten years of imprisonment.

On 19 September 1899, Émile Loubet granted him a presidential pardon. Ten days later, Émile Zola wrote in L'Aurore an open letter to Madame Alfred Dreyfus: 

It was necessary to wait until 12 July 1903, Zola had been dead for nearly four years, so that the judgment of Rennes could be broken without referral. Her husband was finally rehabilitated, and rejoined the army and was knighted the Legion of Honor on 21 July 1903. Throughout the proceedings, she has left the conduct of the defense of her husband to his brother-in-law, Mathieu Dreyfus.

In her correspondence with her friend, Hélène Naville, with humility, she calls her:

During the First World War, she volunteered, and in 1933, she obtained a nursing certificate.

Alfred Dreyfus died in Paris of a heart attack on 12 July 1935. She survived him by a decade. During the Second World War, Lucie is hosted in a convent in Valence under the name of Madame Duteil where only the mother superior knew her true identity. Her granddaughter, Madeleine Levy, Jeanne's daughter, was arrested by French police in Toulouse. She was deported to the East, and died of typhus in Auschwitz in January 1944, aged 25.

Lucie Dreyfus died in Paris on 14 December 1945. She is buried next to her husband at the Montparnasse cemetery (division 28).

Relatives 

She was a second cousin of a French mathematician Jacques Hadamard who was active in the Dreyfus affair.  She was also a great aunt of French singer Yves Duteil who in the second half of the 20th century made an album on the subject.

Cultural depictions
In Dreyfus (1930, Germany) Lucie Dreyfus was played by Grete Mosheim.

In Dreyfus (1931, UK) she was played by Beatrix Thomson.

In The Life of Emile Zola (1937), Lucie was played by Gale Sondergaard.

In the 1958 film I Accuse!, Lucie was played by Viveca Lindfors.

In An Officer and a Spy (2020; French: J'Accuse), Lucie was played by Swan Starosta.

References

External links 
 Lucie, épouse indéfectible sur dreyfus.culture.fr
 correspondance de Lucie Dreyfus sur bnf.fr

Dreyfus affair
People of the French Third Republic
Burials at Montparnasse Cemetery